McFadyean is a surname. Notable people with the surname include:

 Andrew McFadyean (18871974), British diplomat and economist
 Colin McFadyean (born 1943), England International rugby union player and Captain
 John McFadyean (18531941), British veterinary surgeon
 Melanie McFadyean, British journalist and lecturer